Mobstability II: Nation Bizness is the second studio album by Chicago hip hop duo Speedknot Mobstaz (Liffy Stokes & Mayz). Released May 27, 2008 under Get Money Gang Entertainment and Koch Records; it featured guest appearances from Twista, Jim Jones, Mello Tha Gudda Mann and Toxic. The album was made to commemorate the 10 year anniversary of their debut collaborative album with Twista called Mobstability

The first buzz-singles from the album were "Gangstaz Don't Dance" (produced by Drumma Boy) and "Money N Murda", while the official first single is "Money To Blow", with a video already out. As of June 2009 the album has sold over 103,000 copies.

Track listing

References
Speedknot Mobstaz

2008 albums
Twista albums
Albums produced by Drumma Boy
E1 Music albums
Sequel albums
Speedknot Mobstaz albums